King Orry may refer to:

People 
 Godred Crovan (died 1095), eleventh-century Norse-Gaelic ruler of Dublin and the Isles

Ships 
Several ships operated by  the Isle of Man Steam Packet Company:
 , a wooden paddle steamer built in Douglas 1842; sold to Robert Napier & Co. of Glasgow; disposed of in 1858
 , an iron paddle steamer; broken up at Llanerchymor, Wales, in 1912
 , a packet steamer that served until she was sunk during the Evacuation of Dunkirk in 1940
 , the lead ship of the King Orry class of passenger ferries and packet ships, more commonly referred to as the six sisters
 MV King Orry (1972), a multi-purpose ferry renamed King Orry in 1995

See also 
 Manx National Anthem National Anthem of the Isle of Man (verse 2)
 King Orrin